Kallistos Ware (born Timothy Richard Ware, 11 September 1934 – 24 August 2022) was an English bishop and theologian of the Eastern Orthodox Church. From 1982, he held the titular bishopric of Diokleia in Phrygia, later made a titular metropolitan bishopric in 2007, under the Ecumenical Patriarchate of Constantinople. He was one of the best-known modern Eastern Orthodox hierarchs and theologians. From 1966 to 2001, he was Spalding Lecturer of Eastern Orthodox Studies at the University of Oxford.

Early life and ordination
Born Timothy Richard Ware on 11 September 1934 to an Anglican family in Bath, Somerset, England, he was educated at Westminster School in London (to which he had won a King's Scholarship) and Magdalen College, Oxford, where he took a double first in classics as well as reading theology.

On 14 April 1958, at the age of 24, he embraced the Eastern Orthodox Christian faith. He described his first contacts with Orthodoxy and the growing attraction of the Orthodox Church in an autobiographical text entitled "My Journey to the Orthodox Church". While still a layman, he spent six months in Canada at a monastery of the Russian Orthodox Church Abroad. Thoroughly conversant in modern Greek, Ware became an Eastern Orthodox monk at the Monastery of Saint John the Theologian in Patmos, Greece. He also frequented other major centres of Orthodoxy such as Jerusalem and Mount Athos.

In 1966, he was ordained to the priesthood within the Ecumenical Patriarchate and was tonsured as a monk, receiving the name "Kallistos".

Professional and ecclesiastical life
In 1966, Ware became Spalding Lecturer at the University of Oxford in Eastern Orthodox studies, a position he held for 35 years until his retirement. In 1970, he was appointed to a fellowship at Pembroke College, Oxford. In 1982, he was consecrated to the episcopate as an auxiliary bishop with the title Bishop of Diokleia (in Phrygia) in the Archdiocese of Thyateira and Great Britain of the Ecumenical Patriarchate. Following his consecration, Ware continued to teach at the University of Oxford and served in the Greek Orthodox parish in Oxford. From his retirement in 2001, Ware had continued to publish and to give lectures on Orthodox Christianity. He served as chairman of the board of directors of the Institute for Orthodox Christian Studies in Cambridge, and was chairman of the Friends of Orthodoxy on Iona (Scotland) and of the Friends of Mount Athos.
On 30 March 2007, the Holy Synod of the Ecumenical Patriarchate elevated the Diocese of Diokleia in Phrygia to a titular metropolitan diocese and Ware to the rank of metropolitan.

In 2017, Ware was awarded the Lambeth Cross for Ecumenism by the Archbishop of Canterbury "for his outstanding contribution to Anglican–Orthodox theological dialogue".

Death 
In August 2022, his caregivers reported  he was in critical condition and "approaching the end of his life". He died at home in Oxford in the early hours of 24 August 2022 at age 87.

Publications
Ware was a prolific author and lecturer. He authored or edited over a dozen books, numerous articles in a wide range of periodicals, and essays in books on many subjects, as well as providing prefaces, forewords, or introductions to many other books. He is perhaps best known as the author of The Orthodox Church, published when he was a layman in 1963 and subsequently revised several times. In 1979, he produced a companion volume, The Orthodox Way. He collaborated in the translation and publication of major Orthodox ascetic and liturgical texts. Together with G. E. H. Palmer and Philip Sherrard, he translated the Philokalia (four volumes of five published ); and with Mother Mary, he produced the Lenten Triodion and Festal Menaion. St Vladimir's Seminary Press published a Festschrift in his honour in 2003: Abba, The Tradition of Orthodoxy in the West, Festschrift for Bishop Kallistos (Ware) of Diokleia, eds. John Behr, Andrew Louth, Dimitri Conomos (New York: SVS Press, 2003).

Books

 The Orthodox Church (1st ed. Pelican, 1963; 2nd ed. Penguin, 1993 ; 3rd. ed., Penguin, 2015 ).
 Eustratios Argenti: A Study of the Greek Church under Turkish Rule (Clarendon, 1964, ; reprint with a new Introduction, Wipf and Stock, 2013 ).
 The Festal Menaion (translated with Mother Mary) (Faber & Faber, 1977 ).
 (Editor with Colin Davey), Anglican–Orthodox Dialogue: The Moscow Statement Agreed by the Anglican–Orthodox Joint Doctrinal Commission 1976 (London: SPCK, 1977 ).
 The Lenten Triodion (translated with Mother Mary) (Faber and Faber 1978; St. Tikhon's Seminary Press, 2002 ). 
 The Philokalia: The Complete Text (translated with G. E. H.  Palmer and Philip Sherrard. London: Faber and Faber. Vol. 1, 1979 ; Vol. 2, 1982 ; Vol. 3, 1986 ; Vol. 4, 1999 ).
 The Orthodox Way (Mowbray, 1979 ).
 Communion and Intercommunion: A Study of Communion and Intercommunion Based on the Theology and Practice of the Orthodox Church (Light & Life, 1980; rev.ed. 2002 ).
 The Power of the Name – The Jesus Prayer in Orthodox Spirituality (SLG Press, 1982 ). 
 Praying with Orthodox Tradition (Abingdon, 1990 ).
 How Are We Saved?: The Understanding of Salvation in the Orthodox Tradition (Light & Life, 1996 ).
 The Ordination of Women in the Orthodox Church (with Elisabeth Behr-Sigel) (Geneva: WCC Publications, 2000 ).
 The Inner Kingdom: Collected Works, Vol. 1 (St Vladimir's Seminary Press, 2000 ).
 Orthodox Theology in the Twenty-First Century (Geneva: World Council of Churches, 2012 ).

Selected articles 

 "Review of Panagiotis N. Trembelas, Dogmatique de l'Église orthodoxe," Eastern Churches Review 3, 4 (1971), 477–480. 
"God Hidden and Revealed: The Apophatic Way and the Essence-Energies Distinction", Eastern Churches Review 7 (1975). 
"The Debate about Palamism", Eastern Churches Review 9 (1977).
"Wolves and Monks: Life on the Holy Mountain Today", Sobornost 5, 2 (1983).
"Athos after Ten Years: The Good News and the Bad", Sobornost 15, 1 (1993). 
"Through Creation to the Creator", Third Marco Pallis Memorial Lecture, Ecotheology, 2 (London: Friends of the centre, 1996) <www.incommunion.org/2004/12/11/through-creation-to-the-creator> (12.03.2011).
"Dare We Hope for the Salvation of All?" Theology Digest, 45.4 (1998). Reprinted in The Inner Kingdom (Crestwood, NY: St. Vladimir's Seminary Press, 2001). 
"Man, Woman and the Priesthood of Christ", in Thomas Hopko, ed., Women and the Priesthood (Crestwood, NY: St Vladimir's Seminary Press, revised edition, 1999). 
"God Immanent yet Transcendent: The Divine Energies according to Saint Gregory Palamas" in Philip Clayton and Arthur Peacocke, eds., In Whom We Live and Move and Have Our Being: Panentheistic Reflections on God's Presence in a Scientific World (Grand Rapids, MI: Eerdmans, 2004).
"Sobornost and Eucharistic Ecclesiology: Aleksei Khomiakov and His Successors", International Journal for the Study of the Christian Church 11, 2-3 (2011).
"Orthodox Theology Today: Trends and Tasks", International Journal for the Study of the Christian Church 12, 2 (2012).

Selected lectures
 "The Present and Future of Orthodox Theology" (New York, St. Vladimir's Orthodox Seminary, 8 September 2011)
 "Churches of the Christian East" (Fairfax, VA, Orientale Lumen Foundation)
 "Mystical Theology of the Eastern Fathers" (Fairfax, VA, Orientale Lumen Foundation)

References

External links
  Timothy Ware: Strange Yet Familiar: My Journey to the Orthodox Church Autobiographic account of his conversion from Anglicanism to Orthodoxy
 Interview with Bishop Kallistos (RealVideo)
 The Orthodox Way in Greek
 How to Build the Local Church, a talk given at a conference of the Archdiocese of Orthodox parishes of Russian tradition in Western Europe, Institut St-Serge, Paris, October 2005
 Foreword to  issue 13/14 of The Wheel journal, entitled "Being Human"

1934 births
2022 deaths
People from Bath, Somerset
People educated at Westminster School, London
Alumni of Magdalen College, Oxford
Bishops of the Ecumenical Patriarchate of Constantinople
Eastern Orthodox bishops in Europe
Eastern Orthodox theologians
20th-century Christian mystics
20th-century Eastern Orthodox clergy
English Eastern Orthodox Christians
English theologians
English philosophers
English religious writers
English non-fiction writers
Scholars in Eastern Orthodoxy
Eastern Orthodox mystics
Converts to Eastern Orthodoxy from Anglicanism
Fellows of Pembroke College, Oxford
Greek–English translators
20th-century translators
English male non-fiction writers
Corresponding Members of the Academy of Athens (modern)
Hesychasts
People associated with Mount Athos
Translators of the Philokalia